The Freeway Face-Off is an ice hockey rivalry between the National Hockey League (NHL)'s Anaheim Ducks and Los Angeles Kings. The series takes its name from the massive freeway system in the greater Los Angeles metropolitan area, the home of both teams; one could travel from one team's arena to the other simply by traveling along Interstate 5. The term is akin to the Freeway Series, which refers to meetings between the Los Angeles metropolitan area's Major League Baseball teams, the Dodgers and the Angels.

History
The Kings and Ducks are rivals due to geographic proximity. The two teams are situated in the same metropolitan area and share a television market.

The Kings and the Ducks did not meet in the playoffs until the 2014 Western Conference Second Round.

Ducks fans have done the same for away games at the Kings' home ice, Crypto.com Arena. Games between the two teams are often very physical, typically including multiple fights and penalties. The rivalry was showcased for the NHL premiere at the O2 Arena in London at the start of the 2007–08 season with two games between the teams. The Ducks and Kings split both games 4-1 each. The Kings won the first game and the Ducks won the second game. It was also showcased as part of a 2014 NHL Stadium Series match at Dodger Stadium in Los Angeles, where Anaheim reigned victorious in a 3–0 shutout.

The rivalry was further heated during the 2010 NHL Entry Draft, which was hosted by the Kings at Staples Center (renamed Crypto.com Arena in 2021). When the Ducks took the stage to announce Cam Fowler as their first-round, 12th overall pick, the audience predominantly consisting of Kings fans, let out boos.

Prior to 2007, there was no official name for the regular season meetings between the Ducks and Kings. The "Freeway Face-off" name was chosen by a poll of 12,000 local hockey fans. Other names being considered were "Freeze-way Series" and "Ice-5 Series."

Notable moments
 In the 2007–08 season, the Ducks and Kings opened the season by playing a two-game series at O2 Arena in London, England on September 29 and 30, 2007, respectively, with the former date marking the first-ever ice hockey game played at the arena. The opening faceoff was delayed as there was a lighting malfunction in the arena following the national anthems. Los Angeles won the first game by a score of 4–1 with help from then 19-year-old goaltender Jonathan Bernier and two goals from Mike Cammalleri. The Ducks split the series, however, after beating the Kings by a replica 4–1 scoreline in the second game. The second game was notable as Jonas Hiller made his NHL debut, as then-Ducks starting goaltender Jean-Sebastien Giguere was injured to begin the season.
 The Ducks and Kings met on March 26, 2008, at Honda Center in Anaheim for a late-season tilt. Although the Ducks and Kings were near opposites in the standings that year (the Ducks finished fifth in the West while the Kings finished 15th), both teams played to an exhausting effort, as goaltenders Jonas Hiller (Anaheim) and Erik Ersberg (Los Angeles) made game-stopping saves to help their team. The game was focused centrally on the goaltenders, as Hiller stopped 31 of 32 shots, while Ersberg 39 of 40. With the score tied 1–1 on goals from Patrick O'Sullivan (Los Angeles) and Bobby Ryan (Anaheim) through the third period, Kings forward Alexander Frolov stole the puck from a falling Mathieu Schneider at the former's blueline and skated full-speed on a breakaway with under 20 seconds remaining in regulation. Frolov faked a shot, but Hiller made a sprawling pad save, much to the applause of the 17,331 fans in attendance. The two teams then played through overtime scoreless, sending it to a shootout. Kings winger Dustin Brown scored first, but Ducks winger Teemu Selanne evened the shootout on the very next shot at 1–1. The next five shooters all missed their attempts until the Ducks' Schneider scored to put the Ducks ahead 2–1. Los Angeles forward Brian Willsie was stopped by Hiller on the next shot, giving the Ducks a 2–1 shootout victory. The win gave the Ducks a playoff spot at fourth in the West, clinching a playoff berth.
 On January 8, 2009, the Ducks and Kings met for a mid-season game at Staples Center in Los Angeles. The game featured an earthquake midway through the first period, felt by some of the players and also the press writers and fans in attendance. The game was not delayed, however. Los Angeles got off to a 2–0 lead late in the first period and throughout the second on goals from Dustin Brown and Wayne Simmonds. Then-Ducks Head Coach Randy Carlyle replaced goaltender Jean-Sebastien Giguere in favor of Jonas Hiller shortly thereafter, but the Kings scored again on an Anze Kopitar goal to make it 3–0. The game looked one-sided in favor of the Kings until Ducks winger Bobby Ryan scored a power play goal late in the second to put the Ducks on the board. To start the third, Ryan scored again, scoring a rebound off of a Ryan Carter wristshot to cut the Kings' lead to one goal. The most notable moment of the game, however, came just about a minute later when Ducks center Ryan Getzlaf fed an open Ryan on the left wing for a scoring attempt. Ryan put on arguably one of the most dazzling moves of the season, as he skated in on an angle towards the net and put on a roller-hockey style spin move around Kings defenseman Peter Harrold. With Harrold frozen from the play, Ryan pulled the puck back on his stick and tucked it in the back of the net past a sprawling Jonathan Quick. Ryan's hat-trick set a Ducks franchise record for fastest hat-trick in team history at 2:21. The score was tied 3–3, giving the visiting Ducks momentum until Los Angeles re-gained the lead on a power play goal from Alexander Frolov. The Ducks made many last-ditch efforts to tie the game, but Jonathan Quick stonewalled the Ducks' attempts, giving the Kings a 4–3 victory over the Ducks.

Recent developments
Due to the NHL's realignment (including creating the Canadian Division) and adoption of division-only play due to the COVID-19 pandemic, the Ducks and Kings played against each other eight times during the 2020–21 regular season. Both teams, along with their California-rival, the San Jose Sharks were apart of the West Division with the Colorado Avalanche, St. Louis Blues, and Minnesota Wild of the Central and the two United States-based teams in the Pacific (Arizona and Vegas).

Postseason history
As division rivals, the Ducks and Kings could theoretically meet in either the first or second round of the Stanley Cup playoffs. They could also meet in the conference finals, provided that either or both teams qualify for wild card spots. However, neither team can meet in the Stanley Cup Finals. This differs from the similar Freeway Series between MLB's Los Angeles Angels and Los Angeles Dodgers, who are in separate conferences (the American League and National League, respectively) so they can only meet in the final round of the MLB post-season, the World Series; and the Los Angeles Chargers–Los Angeles Rams rivalry (Chargers and Rams are in the American Football Conference and National Football Conference, respectively) so they can only meet in the final round of the NFL post-season, the Super Bowl.

The Ducks and the Kings met in the playoffs for the first time in the 2014 Western Conference Second Round. Anaheim held home ice advantage as a result of winning the Western Conference title. The series began on May 3 at the Honda Center and ended on May 16 with the Kings winning in seven games, en route to winning the Stanley Cup.

Fan reaction
While the Freeway Face-off is not as renowned as other NHL rivalries, Western Conference hockey fans know the rivalry to be intense. The Kings were the first NHL team in Southern California, brought in by the six-team expansion of 1967–68. The Kings' success of the late 1980s and early 1990s, largely due to the arrival of Wayne Gretzky in 1988, helped spike interest in hockey in Los Angeles, also spawning the growth of inline hockey in the area. The Ducks, formerly known the Mighty Ducks of Anaheim, came into the League for the 1993–94 season along with the Florida Panthers. With the Kings having been in existence for 26 years before the Ducks arrived, many saw the Ducks as taking away from the Kings' fanbase and attention in the local market. The Ducks' arrival in nearby Orange County brought new fans to the Southern California hockey scene, creating rivalry between the two teams and their fans. Many Kings fans who were disillusioned with the team's troubles after their 1993 Stanley Cup Finals appearance, and later with the imprisonment of former owner Bruce McNall, became Ducks fans. However, both teams have large, loyal fanbases.

The rivalry is also known for local bragging rights, pitting big-city Los Angeles against its southern neighbor Orange County, which is more suburban. Crypto.com Arena and Honda Center are less than an hour apart via local freeways; many Kings fans fill Honda Center in great numbers, but numerous Ducks fans also make the short trip up the freeway to Staples Center as well. In recent years, crowds at both venues are quite diverse due to both teams' recent successes.

Common players
Bold indicates Stanley Cup win with both teams

Several players have played for both teams, including:

 Jim Thomson – Kings 1991–1992, 1993; Ducks 1993
 Lonnie Loach – Kings 1992–1993; Ducks 1994
 Ken Baumgartner – Kings 1987–1990, 1993; Ducks 1995–1997
 Jari Kurri – Kings 1991–1996; Ducks 1996–1997
 Warren Rychel – Kings 1992–1995; Ducks 1996–1998
 Kevin Todd – Kings 1993–1996; Ducks 1996–1998
 Tomas Sandstrom – Kings 1990–1994; Ducks 1997–1999
 Doug Houda – Kings 1993–1994; Ducks 1998
 Sean Pronger – Ducks 1995–1998; Kings 1999
 Bob Corkum – Ducks 1993–1996; Kings 1999–2001
 Stu Grimson – Ducks 1993–1995, 1998–2000; Kings 2000–2001
 Dan Bylsma – Kings 1995–2000; Ducks 2000–2004
 Ted Donato – Ducks 1999–2000; Kings 2002
 Rob Valicevic – Kings 2001–2002; Ducks 2002–2003
 Craig Johnson – Kings 1996–2003; Ducks 2003–2004
 Sean O'Donnell – Kings 1994–2000, 2008–2010; Ducks 2005–2008
 Kip Brennan – Kings 2001–2004; Ducks 2005–2006
 Oleg Tverdovsky – Ducks 1994–1996, 1999–2002; Kings 2006–2007
 George Parros – Kings 2005–2006; Ducks 2006–2012
 Mathieu Schneider – Kings 2000–2003; Ducks 2007–2008
 Josh Green – Kings 1998–1999; Ducks 2008–2011
 Kyle Calder – Kings 2007–2009; Ducks 2009–2010
 Jason Blake – Kings 1998–2001; Ducks 2010–2012
 Lubomir Visnovsky – Kings 2000–2008; Ducks 2010–2012
 Andreas Lilja – Kings 2000–2003; Ducks 2010–2011
 Dustin Penner – Ducks 2006–2007, 2013–2014; Kings 2011–2013
 Tim Jackman – Kings 2006–2007; Ducks 2013–2016
 Jason LaBarbera – Kings 2005–2006, 2007–2009; Ducks 2014–2015
 Jonathan Bernier – Kings 2007–2013; Ducks 2016–2017
 Nate Thompson – Ducks 2014–2017; Kings 2018–2019
 Luke Schenn – Kings 2016; Ducks 2018–2019
 Carl Hagelin – Ducks 2015–2016; Kings 2018–2019
 Ben Hutton – Kings 2019–2020; Ducks 2021
 Austin Strand – Kings 2021–2022; Ducks 2022–present

See also
 National Hockey League rivalries

Other sports rivalries between teams based in the Greater Los Angeles area:
 El Tráfico
 Freeway Series
 Lakers–Clippers rivalry
 UCLA–USC rivalry

References

Anaheim Ducks
Los Angeles Kings
National Hockey League rivalries
National Hockey League in Greater Los Angeles
1993 establishments in California